The Touch of Leonard Nimoy is the fourth studio album released from Leonard Nimoy. The album was released in 1969, on Dot Records.

Background
Continuing with the folk sound and direction he established with his previous album, the songs range from optimism, political awareness, the human condition, living together, and love.

The song "Maiden Wine" was featured in the Star Trek episode, "Plato's Stepchildren". It is the song sung by Spock while he was being manipulated by the Platonians in 2268 (hence the "serenade from the laughing spaceman", as originally named).

Track listing

Side one
 "I Search for Tomorrow" (Paul Evans, Paul Parnes) 
 "Maiden Wine" (Leonard Nimoy) 
 "Now's the Time" (Val Stoecklein) 
 "Cycles" (Gayle Caldwell) 
 "I Think it's Gonna Rain Today" (Randy Newman)

Side two
 "I Just Can't Help Believin'" (Barry Mann, Cynthia Weil) 
 "Nature Boy" (Eden Ahbez) 
 "Contact" (Nimoy, George Tipton) 
 "The Man I Would Like to Be" (Nimoy, George Tipton) 
 "A Trip to Nowhere" (Don Costa, Johnny Crystal) 
 "Piece of Hope" (Leonard Nimoy)

Production
Producer: Charles R. Grean
Arrangers and Conductor: George Tipton
Engineers: Thorne Nogar and Dave Wiechman
Cover Photography: Tommy Mitchell
Art Direction: Christopher Whorf

External links
Review of Touch of Leonard Nimoy at maidenwine.com, a detailed Leonard Nimoy fan site.

References

Leonard Nimoy albums
Albums produced by Charles Randolph Grean
1969 albums
Folk albums by American artists
Dot Records albums
Albums arranged by George Tipton
Albums conducted by George Tipton